Dnevni rituali is the ninth studio album of the Croatian rock band Aerodrom, released through Croatia Records on 22 November 2019. The album is recorded by the same band members like their previous studio release Taktika noja. The album debuted at #21 on the official Croatian Top 40 chart and peaked at #8. Six singles were released from this album, "Od sutra ne pušim", "Ispod tuša", "Ja te jednostavno volim", which peaked at #13 and spent 12 weeks on the national Top 40 singles chart, "Titanik", "Neka bude", which debuted and peaked at #22 and "Sunce mi se smije", which debuted and peaked at #27.

Critical reception
Dnevni rituali received generally positive reviews. Croatian rock critic Zlatko Gall gave the album three and a half stars on a five-star scale, describing it as a "really solid classic guitar rock album" and as a "band extension of Pađen's awarded solo project All Stars". Aleksandar Dragaš of Jutarnji list reviewed it as a "catchy arena rock / power pop album". Top.HR, a Croatian music chart television programme, presented the album as “a serious competitor for rock album of the year”.

Track listing
All music and lyrics written by Jurica Pađen.

Charts

Album charts

Singles

Personnel 
Aerodrom
Jurica Pađen – Guitars, lead vocals, harmonica
Tomislav Šojat – Bass, backup vocals
Ivan Havidić – Guitars, backup vocals
Damir Medić – Drums, percussions

Additional musicians
Fedor Boić – Keyboards
Mario Domazet – Charango, acoustic guitar
Zvone Domazet – Dobro, slide guitar, programming
Borna Čop – Guitars
Ana Šuto, Jelena Vlačić – Backup vocals
Hrvoje Prskalo - Programming, backup vocals, synth, scream

Artwork
Ljubo Zdjelarević – Photography and design
Luka Vucić – Design

Production
Jurica Pađen – Producer
Hrvoje Prskalo – Producer
Mario Domazet - Coproducer on tracks 3 and 10
Recorded by Hrvoje Prskalo

References

External links
 Official Youtube channel

Aerodrom (band) albums
2019 albums
Croatia Records albums